Iván Javier Rossi (born 1 November 1993) is an Argentine professional footballer. He plays as a midfielder for Platense.

Club career
On 1 February 2021, he signed a 1.5-year contract with Italian Serie C club Sambenedettese.

On 14 July 2021, he moved to Portugal and signed a contract with Primeira Liga club Marítimo.

On 31 January 2023, Rossi signed a one-year contract with Platense.

Honours
Banfield
Primera B Nacional: 2013–14

River Plate
Copa Argentina: 2015–16, 2016–17
Recopa Sudamericana: 2016

References

External links
Profile at River Plate's official website

1993 births
People from Morón Partido
Sportspeople from Buenos Aires Province
Living people
Argentine footballers
Association football midfielders
Club Atlético Banfield footballers
Club Atlético River Plate footballers
Club Atlético Huracán footballers
Colo-Colo footballers
A.S. Sambenedettese players
C.S. Marítimo players
Atlético Junior footballers
Club Atlético Platense footballers
Argentine Primera División players
Chilean Primera División players
Serie C players
Primeira Liga players
Primera Nacional players
Argentine expatriate footballers
Expatriate footballers in Chile
Argentine expatriate sportspeople in Chile
Expatriate footballers in Italy
Argentine expatriate sportspeople in Italy
Expatriate footballers in Portugal
Argentine expatriate sportspeople in Portugal
Expatriate footballers in Colombia
Argentine expatriate sportspeople in Colombia